Background was the first LP released by Lifetime. It was recorded in 1992 and was released on January 1, 1993, as New Age Records #15. The CD version was re-issued on July 1, 1997, with nine live bonus tracks. It is currently out of print although all the songs including the live bonus tracks are available on the Somewhere in the Swamps of Jersey collection. The European edition of the album is titled Ghost and has different artwork and track listing. Ghost was released by Break Even Point Records as a 12" vinyl LP with a limited pressing of 1,000.

Shortly before the album was released, the bass guitarist Justin Janisch was replaced by Linda Kay. Even though Janisch played bass guitar on the record, Kay appears in the group photograph on the back of the album.

Track listing
All songs recorded and mixed at SRA Music Studio in Scotch Plains, New Jersey, during spring and summer 1992
 "You"
 "Pieces"
 "Myself"
 "Thanks"
 "Up"
 "Bedtime"
 "Old Friend"
 "Ghost"
 "Alive"
 "Background"

1997 CD bonus tracks
All bonus tracks were recorded live at Lost Horizons in Syracuse, New York, on July 5, 1992.
  "You"
 "Ghost"
 "Thanks"
 "Dwell"
 "Up"
 "Alive"
 "Gone"
 "Bedtime"
 "Background"

Personnel
 Ari Katz - vocals
 Dan Yemin - guitar
 Scott Saint Hilaire - guitar
 Justin Janisch - bass guitar
 David Wagenshutz - drums

References

1993 albums
Lifetime (band) albums